John Martin (born 8 May 1942) is an Australian cricketer. He played eight first-class and one List A matches for New South Wales between 1966/67 and 1969/70.

See also
 List of New South Wales representative cricketers

References

External links
 

1942 births
Living people
Australian cricketers
New South Wales cricketers
People from Alton, Hampshire